Gail Gregg is an American artist, photographer, and journalist, based in New York City.

Painting in encaustic, Gregg's densely layered pictures often are inspired by aerial views of the American West and refer to Minimalism, Color Field painting, the Pattern and Decoration movement, and classic landscape painting. These same ideas and interests also find their way into her collages and photographs.

Gregg continues to write for such publications as ARTnews. Her work has been exhibited at galleries and small museums across the country.

Early life and education
Gregg was raised in Topeka, Kansas. Her parents are Ann (née Wehe) and Thomas Merrill Gregg. She comes from a Congregationalist family and has a sister and three brothers: Judith Gregg Peters, Tyler Gregg, Gordon Gregg, and Andrew Gregg. Gregg received her bachelor's degree in Journalism from Kansas State University in 1972, a Master's in Journalism from University of North Carolina at Chapel Hill in 1975, and a Master of Fine Arts from Vermont College in 1998. She has also studied for the Bagehot Fellowship for Economics Reporters at Columbia University in New York City; at the School of Visual Arts, the National Academy of Fine Arts in New York City; and the Graduate School of Figurative Art, New York Academy of Art.

Journalism
Gregg started her career in journalism as a reporter in 1976 for United Press International, working in Washington D.C. and London, United Kingdom. This job lasted only three years, and then she moved on to the Congressional Quarterly in 1979, as the Chief Economics Reporter.

Gregg has contributed articles to various newspapers and magazines, including Time, Barron's, Manhattan, Inc., Working Woman, New York Woman, The New York Times, The New York Times Magazine, Institutional Investor, Boston Business Journal, Investor's Daily, ARTnews, and Venture.

Personal life
On May 24, 1975, Greg married Arthur Ochs Sulzberger Jr. The couple have two children: a son, Arthur Gregg "A.G." Sulzberger, and daughter, Annie Sulzberger. In May 2008, they announced plans to end their marriage.

References

External links
 Gail Gregg official website

UNC Hussman School of Journalism and Media alumni
Kansas State University alumni
Vermont College of Fine Arts alumni
Living people
Sulzberger family
Year of birth missing (living people)
American women journalists
21st-century American women